Khadija Jaballah is a Paralympic athlete from Tunisia competing mainly in category F58 throwing events.

Khadija competed in all three throws at the 2000 Summer Paralympics, winning silver in the discus and shot put.

References

1974 births
Living people
Athletes (track and field) at the 2000 Summer Paralympics
Medalists at the 2000 Summer Paralympics
Paralympic athletes of Tunisia
Paralympic medalists in athletics (track and field)
Paralympic silver medalists for Tunisia
Tunisian female discus throwers
Tunisian female shot putters
20th-century Tunisian women
21st-century Tunisian women
Wheelchair discus throwers
Wheelchair shot putters
Paralympic discus throwers
Paralympic shot putters